The 2012 ABL Playoffs is the postseason of the 2012 ABL Regular Season. The four teams with the best regular season record qualify for the playoffs; the team with the higher seed is awarded the home court advantage.

The semifinals are in a best-of-3 format; the team that first wins twice advances to the next round. The venues alternate between the opposing teams; the higher seed hosts Game 1 and 3 (if necessary), while the lower seed hosts Game 2.

Bracket

Semifinals

Beermen vs. Dragons

Patriots vs. Warriors

Finals

Champions

External links
 The official website of the Asean Basketball League

Playoffs
ASEAN Basketball League playoffs